Yasnohirka may refer to several places in Ukraine:

Yasnohirka, Donetsk Oblast, urban-type settlement in Kramatorsk Raion
Yasnohirka, Rivne Oblast, village in Sarny Raion
Yasnohirka, Chudniv urban hromada, Zhytomyr Raion, Zhytomyr Oblast, village in Chudniv urban hromada, Zhytomyr Raion
Yasnohirka, Pulyny settlement hromada, Zhytomyr Raion, Zhytomyr Oblast, village in Pulyny settlement hromada, Zhytomyr Raion